The Aramco Saudi Ladies International is a professional golf tournament on the Ladies European Tour (LET), first played in 2020.

The tournament is played in Saudi Arabia at Royal Greens Golf & Country Club in King Abdullah Economic City by the Red Sea. It was the penultimate regular LET event of the 2020 season and marked the first time professional lady golfers played competitively in the country. It was followed the week after by the Saudi Ladies Team International, a team event that would later develop into the Aramco Team Series.

In 2022, the Ladies European Tour announced that for the February 2023 tournament, the prize money will increase from $1 million to $5 million, giving parity with the men's tournament for the first time.

Winners

See also
Saudi Ladies Team International

References

External links

Ladies European Tour

Aramco Saudi Ladies International
Golf tournaments in Saudi Arabia